Morris Elmore "Mike" Jacobs (April 17, 1876 – March 26, 1949) was a Major League Baseball shortstop.

Sources

Major League Baseball shortstops
Chicago Orphans players
Houston Buffaloes players
Paris Midlands players
Paterson Weavers players
Grand Rapids Furniture Makers players
Davenport River Rats players
Kansas City Blue Stockings players
Evansville River Rats players
Springfield Senators players
Newburgh Hill Climbers players
Charleston Sea Gulls players
Macon Brigands players
Baseball players from Louisville, Kentucky
1876 births
1949 deaths